Marchena is a surname of Spanish origin with Mozarabic influence and may refer to:

 Carlos Marchena (born 1979), Spanish footballer
 Héctor Marchena (born 1965), Costa Rican footballer
 José Marchena Ruiz de Cueto (1768–1821), Spanish author
Manuel Marchena (born 1959), Spanish supreme court judge
 Pepe Marchena (1903–1976), Spanish singer

See also
 Marchena, a spider genus of the family Salticidae (jumping spiders)
 Marchena (city)
 Marchena Island

References